"Oh! Look at Me Now" is a 1941 song composed by Joe Bushkin, with lyrics by John DeVries. It is strongly associated with Frank Sinatra, who first recorded it with Tommy Dorsey and his orchestra, in an arrangement by Sy Oliver. Sinatra re-recorded the song for his 1957 A Swingin' Affair!, this time arranged and conducted by Nelson Riddle.

Notable recordings
Frank Sinatra - with Tommy Dorsey, October 24, 1940, with Tommy Dorsey, Connie Haines and The Pied Pipers, January 6, 1941, A Swingin' Affair! (1957), Sinatra '57 in Concert (1999)
Lee Wiley with Bobby Hackett and Joe Bushkin & His Swinging Strings, December 1950 for the album Night in Manhattan (1951)
Bing Crosby recorded the song in 1954 for use on his radio show and it was subsequently included in the box set The Bing Crosby CBS Radio Recordings (1954-56) issued by Mosaic Records (catalog MD7-245) in 2009. 
George Shearing and Nancy Wilson - The Swingin's Mutual! (1961)
Nancy Wilson - But Beautiful (1969)
Ella Fitzgerald - All That Jazz (1989)
Gareth Gates and Zoe Birkett - Pop Idol: The Big Band Album (2002)
Bobby Darin - for his album Oh! Look at Me Now (1962)
Linda Scott - for her album Hey, Look at Me Now! (1965)
Sam Cooke - for his album “Encore (Sam Cooke album)” (1958)

Sources

Songs with music by Joe Bushkin
Nancy Wilson (jazz singer) songs
Frank Sinatra songs
1941 songs
1941 singles